Robina Bwita, also known as Roninah Bwita and Robina Bwita Duckworth, is a businesswoman in Uganda.

Businesses and investments

See also
List of wealthiest people in Uganda

References

External links
 Moses Mohammed Khamis: Obituary

Living people
Toro people
Ugandan businesspeople
People from Kabarole District
People from Western Region, Uganda
Date of birth missing (living people)
Year of birth missing (living people)